The 2014 Men's Australian Hockey League was the 24th edition of the Australian Hockey League men's Field Hockey tournament. The tournament was held in the South Australia city of Adelaide.

Tassie Tigers won the gold medal for the first time by defeating the WA Thundersticks 3–2 in a penalty shoot-out after a 2–2 draw. The VIC Vikings won the bronze medal for the first time by defeating the QLD Blades 4–2 in a penalty shoot-out after a 4–4 draw.

Competition format
The tournament is divided into two pools, Pool A and Pool B, consisting of four teams in a round-robin format. Teams then progress into either Pool C, the medal round, or Pool D, the classification round. Teams carry over points from their previous match ups, and contest teams they are yet to play.

The top two teams in pools A and B progress to Pool C. The top two teams in Pool C continue to contest the Final, while the bottom two teams of Pool C play in the Third and Fourth-place match.

The remaining bottom placing teams make up Pool D. The top two teams in Pool D play in the Fifth and Sixth-place match, while the bottom two teams of Pool C play in the Seventh and Eighth-place match.

Teams

  Canberra Lakers
  NSW Waratahs
  NT Stingers
  QLD Blades
  SA Hotshots
  Tassie Tigers
  VIC Vikings
  WA Thundersticks

Results

First round

Pool A

Pool B

Second round

Pool C (Medal Round)

Pool D (Classification Round)

Classification matches

Seventh and eighth place

Fifth and sixth place

Third and fourth place

Final

Awards

Statistics

Final standings

Goalscorers

References

2014
2014 in Australian field hockey
Sports competitions in Adelaide